Christoforos Nezer may refer to:

Christoforos Nezer (Bavarian), Bavarian soldier who came to Greece in the 1830s
Christoforos Nezer (d. 1970) (1887-1970), Greek actor, grandson of the above
Christoforos Nezer (d. 1996) (1903-1996), Greek actor, cousin of the above